Munster Technological University Cork GAA club is a Gaelic Athletic Association club located in the Munster Technological University in Bishopstown, Cork, Ireland. The club fields teams in a range of competitions in both hurling and Gaelic football.

History

Gaelic games were first played at the then Cork Regional Technical College when a student Gaelic football team was established in 1975. A student hurling team was set up the following year. The staff of the RTC Cork also had an active GAA club, and competed in various inter-firm hurling and football competitions. 

In 1995, Cork RTC made their debuts in the Fitzgibbon Cup and Sigerson Cup. Teams were also fielded that year in the Cork SHC and Cork SFC for the first time. Three unsuccessful appearances in Fitzgibbon Cup finals followed, while Cork Institute of Technology, as it was then known, won the Sigerson Cup title in 2009. The Cork Institute of Technology also made an unsuccessful appearance in the 2009 Cork SHC final.

Honours

Football

 Sigerson Cup (1): 2009
 Trench Cup (2): 1979, 2020

Hurling

 Ryan Cup (3): 1977, 1980, 1989

Notable players

Football
 Eoin Cadogan
 Graham Canty
 Daniel Goulding
 John Kerins
 Jimmy Kerrigan
 Paul Kerrigan
 Donnacha O'Connor
 Aidan O'Mahony
 Bryan Sheehan

Hurling

 Brian Corcoran
 John Gardiner
 Anthony Nash
 Jackie Tyrell
 Aidan Walsh

References

External link
Cork Institute of Technology GAA site

Gaelic games clubs in County Cork
Hurling clubs in County Cork
Gaelic football clubs in County Cork
GAA